Statistics of Emperor's Cup in the 1971 season.

Overview
It was contested by 8 teams, and Mitsubishi Motors won the championship.

Results

Quarterfinals
Yanmar Diesel 3–1 Waseda University
Nippon Steel 6–1 Chuo University
Hitachi 2–1 Tokyo University of Education
Mitsubishi Motors 4–1 Keio University

Semifinals
Yanmar Diesel 7–1 Nippon Steel
Hitachi 1–2 Mitsubishi Motors

Final

Yanmar Diesel 1–3 Mitsubishi Motors
Mitsubishi Motors won the championship.

References
 NHK

Emperor's Cup
Emperor's Cup
1972 in Japanese football